Powerex Inc., is a Pennsylvania-based company specializing in high power semiconductor applications. Powerex supports many markets, including transportation, AC and DC motor controls, UPS, alternative energy, medical power supplies, welding, industrial heating, electrical vehicles, aircraft and communications.

Established on January 1, 1986, Powerex inc. was the result of cooperation between two major players in the power semiconductor industry -- the Power Semiconductor Divisions of General Electric Company and Westinghouse Electric Corporation. Mitsubishi Electric Corporation later established an equity position in Powerex. In 1994, Westinghouse sold its shares to General Electric and Mitsubishi Electric, the present equal majority shareholders. Corporate offices and manufacturing facilities are located in western Pennsylvania.

Powerex offers a broad line of products, including IGBTs, mosfets, thyristors, rectifiers, diodes, fast recovery diodes, DC-DC converters, and assemblies.

External links
 Powerex Inc. Corporate Website

Equipment semiconductor companies
Mitsubishi Electric